The Gregório River ( is a river of Amazonas and Acre states in western Brazil. 
It is a tributary of Juruá River.

Course

The Gregório River runs in a northeast direction through the Brazilian states of Acre and Amazonas. It has a length total of 350 km.
In Acre between the BR-364 highway and the Amazonas border the river forms the boundary between the  Rio Gregório State Forest to the east and the  Mogno State Forest to the west, two sustainable use conservation units created in 2004.
Across the border in Amazonas the river runs through the  Rio Gregório Extractive Reserve, which protects 80% of the sources of the river.

See also
List of rivers of Acre
List of rivers of Amazonas (Brazilian state)

References
Brazilian Ministry of Transport

Rivers of Acre (state)
Rivers of Amazonas (Brazilian state)